A heritage centre, center, or museum is a public facility – typically a museum, monument, visitor centre, or park – that is primarily dedicated to the presentation of historical and cultural information about a place and its people, and often also including, to some degree, the area's natural history. Heritage centres typically differ from most traditional museums in featuring a high proportion of "hands-on" exhibits and live or lifelike specimens and practical artifacts.

Some are open-air museums – heritage parks – devoted to depiction of daily life or occupational activity at a particular time and place, and may feature re-creations of typical buildings of an era.  Such sites are often used for experimental archaeology, and as shooting locations for documentaries and historical-fiction films and television.  A few are rebuilt archaeological sites, using the excavated foundations of original buildings, some restore historic structures that were not yet lost, while others are mock-ups built near actual sites of historic value (which may still be subject to ongoing excavation, study, and preservation). Many also have living museum features, such as costumed staff, demonstrations of and short courses in historical craft-working, dramatic presentations (live-action mock combat, etc.), and other living history activities.  Others may be more narrowly focused on a particular occupation or industry, such as rail transport or the early factories or mines around which a community developed.

The distinction between a heritage centre or park, and a history-based theme park can become blurred, as at Nikko Edomura, focused on Feudal Japan, and Wild West City, a self-described "heritage theme park" about the American Old West.

Examples, by theme

General and multi-era 
 Gower Heritage Centre
 Irish National Heritage Park
 Ryedale Folk Museum
 St Fagans National Museum of History
 Telugu Saamskruthika Niketanam (World Telugu Museum)

Former life-ways in particular eras 
 Butser Ancient Farm
 Castell Henllys
 Columbia State Historic Park
 Craggaunowen
 Flag Fen Bronze and Iron Age Centre
 Iron-Age-Danube project
 Peat Moors Centre
 Preservation Park
 South Park City
 West Stow Anglo-Saxon Village

History of transport, industry, and occupations 
 Bideford Railway Heritage Centre
 Castlefield
 Crewe Heritage Centre
 Elsecar Heritage Centre
 Gabriel Babb Heritage Centre
 Heritage Motor Centre
 Lincolnshire Aviation Heritage Centre
 Lowell National Historical Park
 Nottingham Transport Heritage Centre
 Rhondda Heritage Park
 Royal Canadian Mounted Police Heritage Centre

See also 
 Heritage interpretation
 Interpretation centre
 List of open-air and living history museums, many of which are heritage-oriented
 Visitor centre

References

Types of museums
Cultural heritage
Heritage centre